Benjiman Eric William McCord (born 17 August 1987) is a New Zealand cricketer. He has previously represented Canterbury, playing as a pace bowler.

References

1987 births
Living people
New Zealand cricketers
Canterbury cricketers